was a Japanese girl group formed by Up-Front Create in 2016. The group consisted of three members: Miyabi Natsuyaki, Hikaru Kobayashi, and Yūka Nihei.

History

Miyabi Natsuyaki was a member of the Japanese idol group Berryz Kobo since 2004, and when the group went on indefinite hiatus in 2014, she decided to continue her singing career and held auditions for new members of a girl group in 2015. Hikaru Kobayashi and Yūka Nihei passed the audition, and they were announced as new group members in April 2016. They made their first public appearance at Buono!'s concert on August 25, 2016.

Pink Cres. released their debut studio album, Crescendo, on June 28, 2017, which also included music videos for the songs "Fun Fun Fun" and "Kirei Kawai Mirai." On June 27, 2018, Pink Cres. released the second studio album, Etcetera.

Pink Cres. was scheduled to release their third studio album, No Borders, on February 6, 2019, but it was postponed. On May 22, 2019, Pink Cres. released their first major double A-side single, "Tokyo Confusion" / "Uchū no Onna wa Amakunai."

On March 19, 2021, the group announced that they would be disbanding at the end of June. On June 30, 2021, the group formally disbanded, with Kobayashi and Nihei leaving Up-Front Create, and Natsuyaki staying with the agency as a soloist.

Members

Discography

Studio albums

Extended plays

Singles

Major

Promotional

Video Albums

References

External links
 

Japanese girl groups
Japanese pop music groups
Musical groups established in 2016
Musical groups from Tokyo
2016 establishments in Japan